November Story is an Indian Tamil-language crime thriller web series for Hotstar Specials, directed by Indhra Subramanian. Produced by Vikatan Televistas the series stars Tamannaah in the lead role along with Pasupathy M., G. M. Kumar and Myna Nandhini. The series is a classic murder mystery where the quest to find the truth behind the crime unveils a series of hidden truths. It was released on Disney+ Hotstar on 20 May 2021.

Cast 
 Tamannaah as Anuradha Ganesan, Ganesan's elder daughter, an ethical hacker by profession
 G. M. Kumar as Ganesan, Anuradha and Mathi's father, a crime novel writer
 Pasupathy M. as Kuzhandhai Yesu, Mathi's foster father
 Johnny as vicenarian Kuzhandhai Yesu
 Ashwanth as young Kuzhandhai Yesu
 Namita Krishnamurthy as Mathi, Ganesan's biological younger daughter and Anuradha's younger sister; Kuzhandhai Yesu's adopted daughter
 Vivek Prasanna as Malarmannan, Anuradha's best friend
 Myna Nandhini as Chithra, Ganesan's caretaker
 Aruldass as Inspector Sudalai
 Kimu Gopal as Kuzhandhai Yesu's assistant
 Janaki Suresh as Savitri, Mathi's caretaker
 Pujitha Devaraju as Neeta Ramchandhani
 Tharani Suresh Kumar as Sudar Ganesan, Ganesan's wife
 Arshath Feras as Binu
 K. Pooranesh as Ahmed
 Nishanth Naidu as Sandeep
 Supergood Subramani

Episodes

Production

Development 
In November 2019, Vikatan Televistas, the television arm of the Tamil magazine Ananda Vikatan announced a web series for the streaming platform Disney+ Hotstar. Tentatively titled The November Story, the makers announced Indhra Subramanian as the director, while Tamannaah, Pasupathy M. and G. M. Kumar in prominent roles. Tamannaah stated about her digital debut stating that "the streaming platforms are also the new playground for accomplished actors looking to break grounds with more challenging roles outside the two-hour cinematic time-frame." She further added that about the character in the series "I love to get under the skin of characters I essay, and hence the longer web series format is the perfect medium to showcase my skills as it is almost like doing five films at one go. There are lots of detailing and one can explore the character in depth." In October 2020, Disney+ Hotstar announced the title of the series as November Story.

Filming 
The shooting of the series began in early November 2019 and the first schedule of the series were completed within the end of the month. The team was able to film most of the series by March 2020 before the nationwide COVID-19 lockdown took place, although production and post-production of the series were affected by COVID-19 restrictions. The remaining portions were shot after lockdown and completed in January 2021.

Release 
Disney+ Hotstar released the teaser of the series on 24 October 2020, during the announcement of their original contents in Tamil language for the platform. The trailer of the series was released on 6 May 2021, through the YouTube channel of Cinema Vikatan, along with its dubbed Hindi and Telugu versions.

Reception 
M. Suganth, editor-in-chief of The Times of India reviewed "The solid performances and production values of the series makes November Story engaging, despite its predictable arc." Ranjani Krishnakumar of Firstpost reviewed "November Story is an excellent entry into the pure-play murder mystery genre, but fails to deliver a satisfying pay-off." Haricharan Pudipeddi of Hindustan Times wrote "November Story unravels slowly, and its pace is an issue at times. But what keeps one engaged is the gripping screenplay that beautifully weaves together a web of incidents to produce something worthwhile. For the most part of the show, the writing is highly competent and one can’t find fault with until the climax which is needlessly long drawn."

Avinash Ramachandran of The New Indian Express wrote "November Story does score high on the engagement factor. Barring the final pay-off that is not exactly an organic culmination, the series largely works. There is a lot of activity, even if they don’t necessarily add up. The forced humour, in particular, fails to add any flavour." Nandini Ramanath of Scroll.in stated "Always slick but equally slippery, the severely overstretched and needlessly complicated series benefits from rich atmospherics and sharp performances."

Manoj Kumar R. in his review for The Indian Express praised the series as a "significant improvement compared to the current Tamil daily soaps on television", but labelled it as a "colossal disappointment" by the analysing the standards of web series. India Today's chief critic Janani K. reviewed it as "If not for its length and some logical loopholes, November Story could have been a great murder mystery." Film critic Srinivasa Ramanujam also gave a mixed verdict, in the review for The Hindu stating that the series "needed to pack in more punch in its core narrative."

References

External links 

 
 November Story at Disney+ Hotstar

Tamil-language web series
Tamil-language Disney+ Hotstar original programming
Tamil-language crime television series
Tamil-language thriller television series
2021 Tamil-language television series debuts
2021 Tamil-language television series endings